Death of a Bachelor is the fifth studio album by Panic! at the Disco, and their first as a solo project, released January 15, 2016 on Fueled by Ramen and DCD2. It is the follow-up to the band's fourth studio album, Too Weird to Live, Too Rare to Die! (2013), with the entire album written and recorded by vocalist/multi-instrumentalist Brendon Urie, who collaborated with other writers including Jake Sinclair, Morgan Kibby, Lolo, and Sam Hollander. It is the band's first album to not feature drummer Spencer Smith and also follows bassist Dallon Weekes' departure from the official line-up, subsequently becoming a touring member once again.

Death of a Bachelor debuted at number one on the US Billboard 200, with 190,000 album units, earning the band its best sales week and first number one album.  The album has been certified double platinum by the Recording Industry Association of America (RIAA) for sales of at least 2,000,000 copies. It was nominated for the Grammy Award for Best Rock Album at the 59th Annual Grammy Awards.

Writing and composition
In an interview with Entertainment Tonight, Urie stated that Death of a Bachelor was lyrically inspired by his wife Sarah Urie and his lifestyle, stating: "This whole album was written at my house where she and I live and it reflects very much the lifestyle I was living [while writing it], which is so different from who I used to be." In an interview with Alt 98.7 mid-2015, he had to say about the album: "It's going to be a little bit different, it's this mix between Sinatra and Queen, if that makes any sense...Every time we do a new album, for me, it's always evolving and changing—in the best way. There's going to be a new energy live."

In April 2015, Urie began recording Death of a Bachelor. A small studio had been built and a piano was bought specifically for the album's production. Production was handled by Jake Sinclair and Urie. Sinclair, who is a friend of Urie's, helped him view the music in "different ways". Urie said he "loved" working in the studio, often running between that and the piano. He played every instrument minus the horns, which he also "love[d]". His views had "all changed from [Too Weird to Live, Too Rare to Die!]", having "different things" he wanted to discuss.

On October 22, 2015, Brendon Urie released a statement through the band's Facebook page on the background of the album:

On January 6, 2016, in an interview with Mixdown magazine, Urie commented on bassist Dallon Weekes' move from the official lineup.

On the day of the titular track's premiere Brendon Urie said on social media:

Urie also stated in an interview with Upset magazine that he feels that the song is "very jazzy, very Sinatra esque.. but then put it with this beat that sounds like Beyoncé's Drunk in Love". The song is also where Urie got the album title from.

Only one song was cut from the album, "Night Birds" described as a "...Driving arena-rocker with a flashy guitar solo". Urie described the song as "A little too early Butch Walker, but definitely not as good" in an interview with Alternative Press.

Release
"Hallelujah" was released as the lead single on April 20, 2015, and serviced to alternative radio. A lyric video was uploaded on the same day and the official music video premiered on July 7, 2015. "Death of a Bachelor" was premiered on Beats 1 on Apple Music by Pete Wentz on September 1, 2015. "Victorious", co-written and produced by CJ Baran, was released for digital download on September 29, 2015, as the second single from the album "Emperor's New Clothes" and its music video was released for digital download on October 21, 2015, as the third official single to coincide with the album's announcement.

The official music video for "Death of a Bachelor" was released on YouTube on December 24, 2015. On December 31, 2015, the band made "Don't Threaten Me with a Good Time" available for streaming. On January 15, 2016, the band premiered the rest of its tracks on its YouTube channel at the same time the album was released. The band went on the Weezer & Panic! at the Disco Summer Tour 2016 with Weezer to promote both of their new albums. On September 22, 2016, the official music video for LA Devotee was released on the band's YouTube channel to coincide with the announcement of the Death of a Bachelor Tour.

Critical reception

Death of a Bachelor received generally positive reviews from music critics. It holds an average score of 69/100 on Metacritic, indicating "generally favorable reviews." In a positive review, The New York Times commented on the album's second single, "Victorious", writing that "[Urie] evokes both the flamboyant swagger of Queen and the mechanized gleam of Daft Punk". Evan Lucy in Alternative Press writing, "For all of its precocious, borderline bratty moments, Death of a Bachelor is a remarkably nuanced affair...it's hard not to break out in goosebumps and marvel at the moving songwriting."

Conversely, The Guardian called the album "hollow and shapeless", also stating that "Urie affects a Vegas croon, indicating a desire to reinvent himself as an edgy Michael Bublé", and how "it's unlikely to pay off". Q wrote, "It's a confusing affair, where [Urie] foolishly tries to croon like Frank Sinatra on the title track and never quite nails down whatever the big idea was supposed to be. Still, there are moments to cherish." AbsolutePunk writer Aaron Mook scored the album a 6/10, noting, "It's been a while since I've heard an album that's so divisive in its quality, so manic on one end and so lazy on the other." Consequence of Sound panned the songs "Don't Threaten Me With a Good Time" and "Crazy=Genius", stating that "['Don't Threaten Me With a Good Time'] lazily squashes together a sample of the B-52s' "Rock Lobster" with lackluster lyrics ("Who are these people/ I just woke up in my underwear") out of tune with their surroundings" and that "'Crazy=Genius'...only serves to remind of how many days have gone by and stand in the way of any musical progress".

Awards and nominations

Commercial performance 
The album debuted at number one on the Billboard 200, with 190,000 album-equivalent units. It also earned Panic! at the Disco its best sales week yet for an album, as it sold 169,000 in pure album sales.  In its second week, the album fell to number 5 on the  Billboard 200 while selling 39,000 equivalent album units (down 79 percent). It was the twelfth best-selling album of 2016 with 506,000 copies sold, which also made it the second best selling rock album of 2016.  Including streams and tracks sales, the album has totaled 845,000 units in the United States in 2016. The album was also certified 2× platinum by the Recording Industry Association of America (RIAA) for combined sales and album-equivalent units of over two million units in the United States.

Track listing
Songwriting credits per booklet.

Notes
  signifies an additional producer.

Personnel
Adapted from the album booklet.

Panic! at the Disco
 Brendon Urie – vocals, guitar, bass, keyboards, drums except for "Hallelujah", background vocals on "Hallelujah", creative and art direction

Additional musicians and production
 Rob Mathes – horn arrangement, conductor
 Andy Snitzer – tenor saxophone
 Dave Mann – tenor saxophone
 Aaron Heick – alto saxophone
 Dave Riekenberg – baritone saxophone
 Mike Davis – tenor trombone
 Randy Andos – bass trombone
 Jeff Kievit – trumpet
 Tony Kadleck – trumpet on "Death of a Bachelor", "Crazy=Genius", "LA Devotee", "Golden Days" and "Impossible Year"; flugelhorn
 Dylan Schwab – trumpet on "Victorious", "The Good, the Bad and the Dirty" and "House of Memories"
 White Sea – background vocals on "Victorious", "Hallelujah", additional production on "LA Devotee" and "House of Memories"
 Mark Stepro – drums on "Hallelujah"
 Nicole Guice – creative and art direction
 Zack Cloud Hall – cover photography
 Shervin Lainez – portrait photography
 The Visual Strategist – layout
 Jake Sinclair – producer on all tracks, background vocals on "Victorious", "Hallelujah"
 JR Rotem – producer on "Don't Threaten Me with a Good Time"
 Imad Royal – producer on "Hallelujah"
 Suzy Shinn – additional production on "Victorious", "Death of a Bachelor", "Crazy=Genius", "LA Devotee", "Golden Days" and "The Good, the Bad and the Dirty", engineer, background vocals on "Victorious", "Death of a Bachelor", "Crazy=Genius", "LA Devotee", "Golden Days" and "The Good, the Bad and the Dirty"
 Claudius Mittendorfer – mixing on all songs except "Hallelujah"
 Michael Brauer – mixing on "Hallelujah"
 Pete Lyman – mastering on all songs except "Hallelujah"
 Joe LaPorta – mastering on "Hallelujah"

Charts

Weekly charts

Year-end charts

Certifications

See also
 List of Billboard 200 number-one albums of 2016
 Weezer & Panic! at the Disco Summer Tour 2016
 Death of a Bachelor Tour

References

2016 albums
Fueled by Ramen albums
Panic! at the Disco albums
Albums produced by J. R. Rotem
Albums produced by Jake Sinclair (musician)
DCD2 Records albums